Rev. Daniel Putnam House is a historic late First Period colonial house in North Reading, Massachusetts. Built in 1720, it is a -story wood-frame structure, five bays wide, with a side-gable roof, central chimney, and a Federal/Greek Revival entry surround.  The house is distinctive in having an extremely well-preserved interior chamber, with intact plaster and paint.  The house is owned by the town of North Reading. It is the headquarters of the North Reading Historical and Antiquarian Society.  The house is open Society meetings and for special events. The house was added to the National Register of Historic Places in 1990.

See also
National Register of Historic Places listings in Middlesex County, Massachusetts

References

External links

North Reading Historical and Antiquarian Society

Houses on the National Register of Historic Places in Middlesex County, Massachusetts
North Reading, Massachusetts
Houses completed in 1720